Juan Figer Svirski (4 October 1934 – 31 December 2021) was a Uruguayan-Brazilian football agent. His organisation, MJF Publicidade e Promoções S/C Ltda, represents, amongst others, Brazilian footballers Robinho, Júlio Baptista, Alex, Zé Roberto, and Europeans Luís Figo and Marcos Senna. He was co-owner of the firm with Wagner Ribeiro. Figer died on 31 December 2021, at the age of 87.

Business deals
He worked very closely with Turkish Süper Lig club Fenerbahçe  club chairman Aziz Yıldırım.

Transfers he has brokered include:

Luís Figo to Real Madrid, July 2000, €60M
Alex to Fenerbahçe, July 2004, $5M
Deivid, Edu Dracena, and Diego Lugano to Fenerbahçe, July 2006,  $52M
Robinho to Real Madrid, July 2005, €50M
Júlio Baptista to Real Madrid, July 2005, €20M
Robinho to Manchester City, July 2008, over €42.5M
Thiago Ribeiro to Cagliari, August 2011, $5M

Clients he represented, past and present, include:
Zico
Robinho
Marcos Senna
Alex
Júlio Baptista
Diego Lugano
Luís Figo
Zé Roberto
Fábio Aurélio
Hulk
José Kléberson
Alberto Acosta
Thiago Ribeiro
Neymar

References

1934 births
2021 deaths
Brazilian football agents
Brazilian people of German descent
Uruguayan emigrants to Brazil
Uruguayan people of German descent